Gampsocorinae is a subfamily of stilt bugs in the family Berytidae. There are about 60 described species in Gampsocorinae.

Tribes and genera
BioLib includes two tribes:

Gampsocorini
Auth.: Southwood & Leston, 1959
 Australacanthus Henry, 1997 c g
 Gampsoacantha Josifov & Stusak, 1987 c g
 Gampsocoris Fuss, 1852 i c g
 Micrometacanthus Lindberg, 1958 c g

Hoplinini
Auth.:Henry, 1997
 Bajacanthus Henry & Wall, 2019
 Cuscohoplininus Dellapé & Carpintero, 2007 c g
 Diabolonotus Henry, 1996 c g
 Hoplinus Stal, 1874 i c g b
 Metajalysus Stusak, 1977 c g
 Oedalocanthus Henry, 1996 i c g
 Parajalysus Distant, 1883 i c g
 Phaconotus Harris, 1943 c g
 Pronotacantha Uhler, 1893 i c g b
 Xenoloma Harris, 1943 c g

Data sources: i = ITIS, c = Catalogue of Life, g = GBIF, b = Bugguide.net

References

Further reading

External links

 

Berytidae